Monon may refer to:
 Monon Bell,  locomotive bell that symbolizes the DePauw-Wabash football rivalry
 Monon, Indiana, United States
 Monon Township, White County, Indiana,
Monon Railroad, a former railroad in Indiana
Monon Commercial Historic District
 Monon Trail, a rail trail in Indiana
Saint Monon (died c. 645), a Scottish hermit and martyr
Salinta Monon (1920–2009), a Filipino textile weaver
Eudesmia monon, a moth